The following is a list of ecoregions in Colombia defined by the World Wide Fund for Nature (WWF).

Colombia is considered one of the world's 'megadiverse' countries, and is home to one in ten of the world's plant and animal species. It is ranked first in bird and orchid species diversity, and second in plants, butterflies, freshwater fishes and amphibians. Colombia's location in the tropics and its varied topography create a diverse range of habitats, including tropical rain forests, deserts, high mountains, coral reefs, and mangroves.

Terrestrial
Colombia is in the Neotropical realm. Ecoregions are listed by biome.

Tropical and subtropical moist broadleaf forests
 Caquetá moist forests
 Cauca Valley montane forests
 Cayos Miskitos–San Andrés and Providencia moist forests
 Chocó–Darién moist forests
 Cordillera Oriental montane forests
 Eastern Cordillera Real montane forests
 Eastern Panamanian montane forests
 Guayanan Highlands moist forests
 Japurá–Solimões–Negro moist forests
 Magdalena Valley montane forests
 Magdalena–Urabá moist forests
 Napo moist forests
 Negro–Branco moist forests
 Northwestern Andean montane forests
 Rio Negro campinarana
 Santa Marta montane forests
 Solimões–Japurá moist forests
 Venezuelan Andes montane forests
 Western Ecuador moist forests

Tropical and subtropical dry broadleaf forests
 Apure–Villavicencio dry forests
 Cauca Valley dry forests
 Patía Valley dry forests
 Sinú Valley dry forests

Tropical and subtropical grasslands, savannas, and shrublands
 Llanos

Montane grasslands and shrublands
 Northern Andean páramo
 Santa Marta páramo

Deserts and xeric shrublands
 Guajira–Barranquilla xeric scrub
 Malpelo Island xeric scrub

Mangroves
 Esmeraldas–Pacific Colombia mangroves
 Magdalena–Santa Marta mangroves
 Gulf of Panama mangroves

Marine

Tropical Atlantic
Colombia's Atlantic coast marine ecoregions are in the Caribbean Sea marine province.
 Southern Caribbean
 Southwestern Caribbean

Tropical Eastern Pacific
 Panama Bight

References

 
ecoregions
Colombia
ecoregions
Colombia